The ecology of Hong Kong is mostly affected by the results of climatic changes. Hong Kong's climate is seasonal due to alternating wind direction between winter and summer.

Hong Kong has been geologically stable for millions of years. Flora and fauna in Hong Kong are altered by climatic change, sea level alternation, and human impact.

Climate
Hong Kong has a subtropical climate, which is additionally influenced by the monsoon in spring. The average daily maximum temperatures range from 19 to 32 degrees, depending on the season. There are hot, humid summers and temperate, dry winters. With daily highs of 33 °C, it is warmest from late May to mid-September. Over 2200 liters of rain per square meter fall annually - 80% of it between May and September. Of these, June and August are the wettest months, with rain falling on almost four out of seven days. With only one rainy day per week in January and December, these are the driest months. Between late May and mid-September, typhoons and violent thunderstorms can occasionally occur.

Land
The total land area of Hong Kong is 1,076 square kilometres, but about 75% of this land is open countryside, which contains more than 2600 species of vascular plants, about 450 species of birds, about 200 species of butterflies, about 100 species of dragonflies, 40 species of mammals, 80 species of reptiles and more than 20 species of amphibians, including some that are endemic to the territory.

Species richness in Hong Kong

Hong Kong is considered rich in species variety. The number of bird species in Hong Kong is fully one-third of that in China along with one-sixth as many butterflies species, according to surveys.

Ecosystems in Hong Kong

Mangroves
Mangroves are habitats of enclosed intertidal mud flats with greatly reduced wave action, located near sources of fresh water. Popular mangrove habitats in Hong Kong are located along Deep Bay, such as Pak Nai and Tsim Bei Tsui, where salinity is very low under the influence of fresh water from the Pearl River, and along some mud flats where salinity is lowered by surrounding streams, such as Three Fathoms Cove and Ting Kok. Trees living in this habitat are called mangrove trees.

The following are the sites of mangroves in Hong Kong:
Deep Bay
Tolo Harbour
Hoi Ha Wan
Long Harbour
Hebe Haven
Tai O
Tung Chung
Tai Tam Harbour
Pui O
 Kei Ling Ha

Rocky shores
The tidal range of Hong Kong is about 2.5 metres and the distribution of species situated in this region must be tolerant of conditions when the shore is covered with seawater at high tide and when the shore is directly exposed to the air at low tide, for hours or days. Species may adapt to these varying conditions by successfully exploiting narrow vertical zones along the rocky shore.

The species inhabiting Hong Kong's rocky coastal areas vary depending the exposure to the wave action from the sea. The sessile filter-feeding organisms inhabit the wave-exposed shoreline. They are able to attach on the rock surface and remove food particles in the turbulent water, while the mobile herbivores and carnivores prefer the sheltered shores. The varieties of organisms also varies with the season, especially in Hong Kong where oceanic currents change through the year. For instance, very few erect foliose macro-algae can tolerate Hong Kong's summer heat, but they are common in winter.

The following are the sites of rocky shores in Hong Kong:
Luk Keng
Kei Ling Ha Lo Wai
Cape D'Aguilar Marine Reserve

Streams
There are two kinds of freshwater habitats: lentic (still, or very slow moving) water, such as lakes, ponds, ditches, and lotic (flowing) water, such as rivers, streams.  

There are three main factors to differentiate the habitats in Hong Kong: variability of current, amount of detritus and variable oxygen content. These factors influence animals' various adaptive responses. They have to attach themselves to the surfaces, become predominantly detritus feeders and have a mechanism for obtaining maximum oxygen supply.

The following are the list of rivers in Hong Kong:
Wa Mei Shan
Lam Tsuen River
Shing Mun River

Sandy shores
The following are the site of sandy shores in Hong Kong:

Starfish Bay

Problems

Pollution

General

In 1989, the Hong Kong government realised that Hong Kong was in danger of becoming a vast, densely populated city. Due to the growth of the economy and business sectors, the water, waste and air pollution cause an adverse effect on the balance of ecology in Hong Kong.

Factories, farms and restaurants in the New Territories dump large amounts of sewage and even untreated waste into the streams and the sea. It makes the New Territories' streams be 'no better than open sewers'. This severe damage is irreversible and the creatures in the sea are the direct victims.

The pink dolphin is one of the victims. Under threat from chemical pollution, increased sea traffic and the destruction of much of the natural shoreline for land reclamation, the number of pink dolphins has dramatically declined with the city's ongoing development.

The nature reserve and birds in Mai Po Marsh are also victims. They are threatened by pig sewage flooding as well as the increased pollution from Shenzhen. Yet according to World Wide Fund for Nature Hong Kong the number of the endangered black-faced spoonbills wintering in Mai Po has risen from roughly 35 in the late 1980s to 152 after 10 years. About 400 have been spotted after 2000. Estimates on how many of these birds remain in the wild vary from 1,000 to 2,000.

The oyster farms have been throttled by a mixture of pollution and competition from cheaper oyster cultivation across the border in China.

Air pollution

Air pollution is another serious problem. Smoke-belching factories, intense construction and large numbers of diesel vehicles have led to dangerous levels of particulate matter and nitrogen dioxide. It's not only the flora and fauna that are affected – humans are too. Cases of asthma and bronchial infections have soared in recent years, and doctors place the blame squarely on poor air quality.

Thermal pollution
According to a Baptist University study, daily average minimum temperatures have increased by 0.02 degrees (Celsius) annually between 1965 and 2003, due to the urban heat island effect, which traps heat during the daytime and releases it at night. Average daily maximum temperatures have fallen by 0.014 degrees each year, as air pollution blocks solar radiation. Resulting increased nighttime ambient temperatures incite families to use domestic air-conditioning, which further compounds the problem.

Research has shown that the ambient air-temperature in urban areas can be some 5 °C higher than non built-up areas. The Hong Kong Polytechnic University commissioned NASA to take a high-resolution thermal image of urban Hong Kong by satellite at 22:40 on 4 August 2007, which showed at least a four-degree difference between the coolest areas and the "urban heat islands". The variations are attributable to greater absorbency of man-made materials, and building density that restrict air-flow. The affected area had expanded into Hung Hom since January, when the first image was taken.

"Wall effect"

There has been increasing concern since 2006 over the "wall effect" caused by uniform high-rise developments that adversely impact air circulation. Due to the density of Hong Kong's population and the economies of scale of mass developments, there is the tendency of new private tower block developments with 10 to over 100 towers, ranging from 30 to 70 stories high. Developers of housing estates are financially motivated to maximise the view, at the expense of the free flow of air. Huge wall-like estates along the waterfront are often constructed.

In-fill developments are typically constructed by smaller developers with less capital. These will be smaller in scale, and less prone to the wall effect.

Environmental group Green Sense expressed concern that their survey on 155 housing estates found 104 have a 'wall-like' design. It cited estates in Tai Kok Tsui and Tseung Kwan O as the "best examples".  In May 2007, citing concern over developments in West Kowloon, and near Tai Wai and Yuen Long railway stations, some legislators called for a law to stop developers from constructing tall buildings that adversely affect airflow in densely populated areas, but the bid failed. In 2007, residents of Tai Kok Tsui, increasingly aware of the problem, have been lobbying against the further proliferation of such high-rises in their area that threaten the last air corridor.

Threats to flora and fauna

Destruction of habitat
Encroachment of the green belt
Effect of the Building Waste Levy

Illegal hunting of species by mainland Chinese
With increasing affluence of mainland Chinese, some of them become affable to some luxury flora and fauna, like Podocarpus macrophyllus (Cantonese: lo hon chung) and Cuora trifasciata (Cantonese: kam chin kwai). Some luxury species are becoming increasingly rare in South China due to increased hunting, and hunters turn to Hong Kong.

Introduction of non-indigenous species
Most of the introduced species do little harm to the ecology of Hong Kong.
However, some species are invasive and cause massive damage to the ecology and/or economy of Hong Kong.

Examples are the pinewood nematode from North America and pine-needle scale insect from Taiwan, which together virtually eliminated the native Pinus massoniana in the 1970s and 1980s.

Gallery

See also

Geography of Hong Kong
Conservation in Hong Kong
Environment of mainland China
Hong Kong–Zhuhai–Macau Bridge
List of protected species in Hong Kong
Species first discovered in Hong Kong
List of mammals of Hong Kong
List of birds of Hong Kong
List of Hong Kong amphibians
Hong Kong Dolphin Conservation Society
Hong Kong Bird Watching Society

References

External links
The World Wildlife Fund (WWF) in Hong Kong
Environmental Protection Department
HKNature.net
HKWildlife.net forum
HK-Ecosite
Waterfalls in Hong Kong
Hong Kong - how to breathe easier
 Clear the Air Hong Kong
Hong Kong Bird-Watching Society

 
Geography of Hong Kong
Ecology of Hong Kong